Wojciech Niemiec (21 October 1956 – 28 December 2021) was a Polish footballer, playing as a defender.

Club career
He started his career in Polonia Przemyśl, then he moved to Stal Mielec where he won the Polish championship in 1976. In the 1976–77 season he was a footballer of Legia Warsaw, in which he played one game by scoring a goal in the League Cup against Stal Mielec. Later, he played for a season in Zawisza Bydgoszcz, and for the last 11 years of his career in Stal Stalowa Wola. In the years 1993–1994 he was still playing for the Polish diaspora in Hamburg.

Personal life and death
Niemiec was born in Przemyśl, Poland. He died on 28 December 2021, at the age of 65.

Honours
Stal Mielec
 Polish championship: 1975–76

References

External links
 

1956 births
2021 deaths
People from Przemyśl
Polish footballers
Association football defenders
Polonia Przemyśl players
Stal Mielec players
Stal Stalowa Wola players
Zawisza Bydgoszcz players
Legia Warsaw players
Ekstraklasa players
Polish expatriate footballers
Polish expatriate sportspeople in Germany